The Visitors Information Center, also known as the Rose Building, is a historic building located on Naito Parkway in downtown Portland, Oregon,  United States. Built in 1948, it is noted as a prominent product of its architect John Yeon. It is listed on the National Register of Historic Places.

In this, his only major non-residential commission, Yeon combined the principles of the International style with strong influences of the Northwest Regional style, which he pioneered. Northwest Regional elements include the naturally-inspired color scheme, the use of plywood walls and louvered ventilation panels, and concern for the site's unique views.

The building has served as a chamber of commerce office and information center, city offices, a restaurant, and the headquarters of the Portland Rose Festival. Originally situated adjacent to a freeway in a highly developed waterfront district, the Visitors Information Center was subsequently retained when Tom McCall Waterfront Park was developed around it. It now stands within the park.

See also
National Register of Historic Places listings in Southwest Portland, Oregon

Notes

References

External links

Government buildings completed in 1948
John Yeon buildings
Buildings and structures in Portland, Oregon
National Register of Historic Places in Portland, Oregon
International style architecture in Oregon
1948 establishments in Oregon
Southwest Portland, Oregon
Portland Historic Landmarks
Tom McCall Waterfront Park